The 1974 South Australian Championships was a combined men's and women's professional tennis tournament played on outdoor grass courts in Adelaide, Australia. It was the 76th edition of the tournament and was held from 1 December until 7 December 1974. First-seeded Björn Borg and Olga Morozova won the singles titles.

Finals

Men's singles

 Björn Borg defeated  Onny Parun 6–4, 6–4, 3–6, 6–2
 It was Borg's 8th singles title of the year and of his career.

Women's singles
 Olga Morozova defeated  Evonne Goolagong 7–6, 2–6, 6–2

Men's doubles

References

External links
 ITF tournament edition details
 ATP tournament profile

 
South Australian Tennis Championships
South Australian Tennis Championships, 1974
South Australian Tennis Championships
South Australian Tennis Championships